The Calderdale Explorers are an English basketball club, based in Halifax, West Yorkshire. 

The Explorers compete in English Basketball League Division 3 North.  A previous incarnation of the club was a founding member of the British Basketball League, reaching the playoff semi-finals during the league's inaugural season in 1987-1988.

History
The team was established as the Halifax Explorers in 1982, when they entered Division 2 of the National Basketball League.  They changed their name to Calderdale after just one year, and in 1986 the club won promotion to Division 1, which was then the top tier of basketball in England.

In 1987, the Explorers joined 14 other teams from the National Basketball League (England) and Scottish National Basketball League to form the new British Basketball League.  The Explorers were successful in the new top flight, finishing fifth in league competition and reaching the playoff semi-finals while also reaching the quarter-finals of the National Cup.  However, the club were forced to withdraw from the professional league after just one season, as they could not afford the court hire charge of just £14 at their North Bridge Leisure Centre venue.  The club returned to competition in NBL Division 2 a year later in 1989, but ongoing financial issues meant the club soon folded in 1992, just a decade since they were founded.

The club was revived in 2014, initially as a junior club competing in local competitions.  A senior National League team was added in March 2015, entering the National Development League for their first season before the league was rebranded as Division 4.  A steady record for improvement culminated with winning the Division 4 (North) league title at the end of the 2017/2018 season, earning promotion to Division 3. The Explorers were coached in Division 3 by Peter Broderick, who played for the old club in the 1990s.

Honours

NBL Division 4 League Champions
 2018

Season-by-season records

References

Basketball teams in England
Sport in Halifax, West Yorkshire
History of West Yorkshire